The 38th National Hockey League All-Star Game was held in the Hartford Civic Center in Hartford, home to the Hartford Whalers, on February 4, 1986.

Highlights
The Professional Hockey Writers' Association (PHWA) had annually chosen participants of the NHL All-Star Game prior to the league's fans voting for the starting players as of the 1986 All-Star Game. When the league's fans voted Pelle Lindbergh as a starting goaltender in the 1986 game despite his death a few months earlier, PHWA president Rod Beaton doubted that the PHWA would have been chosen Lindbergh since its members were not sentimental and took the choice seriously. Beaton felt that the fans "had voted with reasonable intelligence", and choosing Lindbergh "was a quality gesture", but was disappointed when a deserving player did not play because fans voted for a long-term star instead.

Game summary

Referee: Ron Wicks
Linesmen: Gord Broseker, John D'Amico
TV: TSN, ESPN

Sources

References

All-Star Game
National Hockey League All-Star Games
Sports competitions in Hartford, Connecticut
National Hockey League All-Star Game
Ice hockey competitions in Connecticut
20th century in Hartford, Connecticut
National Hockey League All-Star Game